Thomas Alan Petranoff (born April 8, 1958) is a retired American track and field athlete who competed in the javelin throw. He held the world record (old implement javelin) from May 1983 to July 1984; his 99.72 m (327 ft) throw was almost the length of an American football field (. During his career, he was a silver medalist at the World Championships in 1983 and represented the United States at the Summer Olympics in 1984 and 1988. He transferred to South Africa in the 1990s and was twice a winner at the African Championships. In the final years of his career, he returned to the United States and won a medal at the 1999 Pan American Games.

Career
Petranoff's world record added precisely three meters to the previous global standard of 96.72 m, set in 1980 by Hungary's Ferenc Paragi. Petranoff's effort fueled further discussion and speculation regarding the likelihood of alterations to the javelin's design and flight characteristics. Propelled by the need to shorten distances and the then frequent flat or ambiguous landings (which resulted in many controversial official judgements), a change to a new design finally took effect in April 1986. By then, East German Uwe Hohn had greatly improved Petranoff's mark with a throw of 104.80 meters. This throw came after the changes had been officially proposed and (unlike Petranoff's record) was not a driving cause of the change.

Petranoff's mark with the old javelin design was never exceeded by any throw other than Hohn's mark. He also did well with the new design; his personal best of 89.16, thrown at Potchefstroom, South Africa on March 1, 1991, was at the time the second best ever (excluding marks thrown with a soon-to-be-banned "rough-tailed javelin" that had been introduced by Miklós Németh), behind only Steve Backley's world record of 89.58 m.

In 1984, Petranoff won the Superstars championship with a record score of 61 points. He qualified for the United States Olympic Team, but finished a disappointing 10th in the final in Los Angeles.

A native of Illinois, Petranoff later became a citizen of South Africa and competed for that country in various international competitions.

Personal life
Petranoff is also the inventor of the "Turbo Javelin." This implement is used for javelin practice, especially of the indoor kind. Made of heavy-duty plastic and a rubber tip, the turbo javelin is very safe and ideal for indoor practice, and makes a good substitute for younger throwers as the official javelin can be dangerous. It is now used in its own competitions for people of all ages and is great for recreation departments and much more. The world record holder with the turbo javelin is Breaux Greer of the U.S.A.

Petranoff now lives in California; he has coached for institutions such as Boston University.

International competitions

References

External links
Interview

1958 births
Living people
Sportspeople from Aurora, Illinois
Track and field athletes from Illinois
American male javelin throwers
South African male javelin throwers
South African masters athletes
Olympic track and field athletes of the United States
Athletes (track and field) at the 1984 Summer Olympics
Athletes (track and field) at the 1988 Summer Olympics
Pan American Games medalists in athletics (track and field)
Pan American Games bronze medalists for the United States
Athletes (track and field) at the 1999 Pan American Games
World Athletics Championships athletes for the United States
World Athletics Championships athletes for South Africa
World Athletics Championships medalists
American emigrants to South Africa
World record setters in athletics (track and field)
Goodwill Games medalists in athletics
Competitors at the 1986 Goodwill Games
Medalists at the 1999 Pan American Games